Hervé Lord (born March 3, 1958) is a Canadian ice sledge hockey player. He was born in Saint-Pamphile, Quebec, Canada.

In the Paralympic Games, Lord has won numerous medals as a member of the Canadian team including  bronze (1994), silver (1998) and gold (2006). He also competed with teams which finished in fourth place in 2002 and 2010.

Lord took the athletes' oath on behalf of all competitors at the 2010 Winter Paralympics in Vancouver. He announced his retirement from the Canadian ice sledge hockey team on September 7, 2010 (along with captain Jean Labonte, Todd Nicholson and goaltender Paul Rosen). Lord also participated at the Soldier On Paralympic Sport Summit at Carleton University in May 2008 in an effort to assist Canadian military members rebound from debilitating injuries resulting in permanent disability.

Career stats

Hockey Canada

Awards and honors
King Clancy Outstanding Achievement Award, 2006 Paralympics 
Tournament All-Star team, 1992 World Cup

References

External links
 
 
 

1958 births
Living people
Sportspeople from Quebec
Canadian sledge hockey players
Paralympic sledge hockey players of Canada
Paralympic gold medalists for Canada
Paralympic silver medalists for Canada
Paralympic bronze medalists for Canada
Ice sledge hockey players at the 1994 Winter Paralympics
Ice sledge hockey players at the 1998 Winter Paralympics
Ice sledge hockey players at the 2002 Winter Paralympics
Ice sledge hockey players at the 2006 Winter Paralympics
Ice sledge hockey players at the 2010 Winter Paralympics
Medalists at the 1994 Winter Paralympics
Medalists at the 1998 Winter Paralympics
Medalists at the 2006 Winter Paralympics
Paralympic medalists in sledge hockey